Adolphe Alphonse Favre (1 May 1808 – 15 January 1886) was a 19th-century French playwright, journalist, poet and novelist.

Chief editor of the satirical newspaper la Revue parisienne (1851), he was one of the promoters of the retour des cendres of Napoleon, which  he asked King Louis-Philippe in his pamphlet L’Homme du rivage ou l’illustre tombeau.

He is buried at Père Lachaise Cemetery (67th division).

Works 

1844: Faisons-nous belle, boléro, music by Oscar Comettant
1852: L'Amour d'un Ange, poetry
1855: Le Carrefour de la Croix, novel, 2 vols.
1856: L'Amour et l'argent, novel, 2 vols.
1859: Le Capitaine des archers, novel
1859: L’Œuvre du démon, novel
1861: La Chasse à ma femme, one-act comédie en vaudeville, with Adolphe Stel
1861: Les Portraits-cartes, one-act comédie en vaudeville, with Paul Faulquemont
1863: L’Orfèvre du Pont au Change : ou Paris en 1480, five-act drama, with Faulquemont
1864: Les Métamorphoses de Bougival, one-act comédie en vaudeville with Stel
1865: La Coupe Maudite, novel
1866: La Porte Saint-Denis (1672), five-act drama, with Auguste Villiers
1867: Nouvelles de Adolphe Favre, volume 1 : includes Le Bracelet de corail, Le Secret du cœur, Le Mariage au jardin, Le Doigt de Dieu, L'Anneau d'or, Monsieur Landroux
1867: L'Enlèvement au Bouquet, one-act comedy, with Stel
1868: Nouvelles de Adolphe Favre, volume 2, includes Maître Guillaume, L'Épingle d'or, Le Cœur d'une paysanne, Le Pan de la robe, Le Bouquet de violettes1868: Les Cendres de Napoléon et le Sénat1881: Comment meurent les femmes, novel
undated: Un Martyr de la victoire, five-act drama, with Faulquemont

 Bibliography 
 J. F. Vaudin, Gazetiers et gazettes: histoire critique et anecdotique de la Presse parisienne, vol.1, 1860, (p. 138-139)
 Hippolyte Verly, Essai de biographie lilloise contemporaine, 1800-1869, 1869, (p. 91)
 Gustave Vapereau, Dictionnaire universel des contemporains, vol.1, 1870, (p. 658) 
 Robert Sabatier, Histoire de la poésie française'' (XIXe siècle), 1977, (p. 12-13)

References 

19th-century French poets
19th-century French journalists
French male journalists
19th-century French dramatists and playwrights
19th-century French novelists
1808 births
Writers from Lille
1886 deaths
Burials at Père Lachaise Cemetery
19th-century French male writers